The United States Attorney for the Eastern District of Tennessee is the chief federal law enforcement officer in forty-one Tennessee counties. The U.S. District Court for the Eastern District of Tennessee has jurisdiction over all cases prosecuted by the U.S. Attorney. Doug Overbey, who was appointed by President Donald Trump in 2017, is the current U.S. Attorney for the District.

Organization

The office is headquartered in Knoxville, and maintains staffed offices in Greeneville and Chattanooga, and an unstaffed office in Winchester.

The Knoxville Division handles cases from fourteen counties: Anderson, Blount, Campbell, Claiborne, Grainger, Jefferson, Knox, Loudon, Monroe, Morgan, Roane, Scott, Sevier, and Union.

The Chattanooga Division handles cases from nine counties: Bledsoe, Bradley, Hamilton, McMinn, Marion, Meigs, Polk, Rhea, and Sequatchie.

The Winchester Division handles cases from eight counties: Bedford, Coffee, Franklin, Grundy, Lincoln, Moore, Van Buren, and Warren. 

The Greeneville Division handles cases from ten counties: Carter, Cocke, Greene, Hamblen, Hancock, Hawkins, Johnson, Sullivan, Unicoi, and Washington.

List of U.S. Attorneys for the Eastern District of Tennessee

Edward Scott, 1805–1807
James Temble, 1807–1808
Hugh Lawson White, 1808–1809
James Temble, 1809–1810
John McCampbell, 1810–1821
Pryor Lea, 1821–1828
John A. McKinney, 1828–1840
George W. Churchill, 1840–1843
Crawford W. Hall, 1843–1844
Thomas C. Lyon, 1844–1850
Samuel R. Rodgers, 1850–1853
J. C. Ramsey, 1853
Richard J. Hays, 1853–1857
J. C. Ramsey, 1857–1861
John L. Hopkins, 1861
John M. Fleming, 1861
E. C. Camp, 1869–1876
George Andrews, 1876–1879
Xenophon Wheeler, 1879–1883
James M. Meek, 1883–1885
James C. J. Williams, 1885–1889
Hugh B. Lindsay, 1889–1893
James H. Bible, 1893–1897
James E. Mayfield, 1897
William D. Wright, 1897–1905
James R. Penland, 1905–1910
James B. Cox, 1910–1913
Lewis M. Coleman, 1913–1917
Wesley T. Kennerly, 1917–1921
George C. Taylor, 1921–1928
Everett Greer, 1928–1930
William J. Carter, 1930–1933
James B. Frazier Jr., 1933–1948
Otto T. Ault, 1948–1953
John H. Reddy, 1953
John C. Crawford Jr., 1953–1961
John H. Reddy, 1961–1969
Robert E. Simpson, 1969
John L. Bowers Jr., 1969–1977
Robert E. Simpson, 1977
John H. Cary, 1977–1981
William T. Dillard, 1981
John W. Gill Jr., 1981–1991
Jerry G. Cunningham, 1991–1993
David G. Dake, 1993
Guy W. Blackwell, 1993
Carl K. Kirkpatrick, 1993–2001
James R. Dedrick, 2001
Harry Sandlin Mattice Jr., 2001–2005
James R. Dedrick, 2005–2010
Greg Sullivan, 2010
William C. Killian, 2010-2015
Nancy Stallard Harr, 2016-2017
Doug Overbey, 2017-2021
Francis "Trey" Hamilton III, 2021-Present

References

External links
Official site